The Metallurgichesky constituency (No.190) is a Russian legislative constituency in Chelyabinsk Oblast. The constituency covers northern Chelyabinsk Oblast. Until 2007 Kyshtym constituency stretched to the west, covering several districts of the Mountain-Industrial Zone, however, in 2015 it was reconfigured to include parts of urban Chelyabinsk instead.

Members elected

Election results

1993

|-
! colspan=2 style="background-color:#E9E9E9;text-align:left;vertical-align:top;" |Candidate
! style="background-color:#E9E9E9;text-align:left;vertical-align:top;" |Party
! style="background-color:#E9E9E9;text-align:right;" |Votes
! style="background-color:#E9E9E9;text-align:right;" |%
|-
|style="background-color:#0085BE"|
|align=left|Aleksandr Kushnar
|align=left|Choice of Russia
|
|32.13%
|-
|style="background-color:"|
|align=left|Natalya Mironova
|align=left|Yavlinsky–Boldyrev–Lukin
| -
|13.20%
|-
| colspan="5" style="background-color:#E9E9E9;"|
|- style="font-weight:bold"
| colspan="3" style="text-align:left;" | Total
| 
| 100%
|-
| colspan="5" style="background-color:#E9E9E9;"|
|- style="font-weight:bold"
| colspan="4" |Source:
|
|}

1995

|-
! colspan=2 style="background-color:#E9E9E9;text-align:left;vertical-align:top;" |Candidate
! style="background-color:#E9E9E9;text-align:left;vertical-align:top;" |Party
! style="background-color:#E9E9E9;text-align:right;" |Votes
! style="background-color:#E9E9E9;text-align:right;" |%
|-
|style="background-color:#2C299A"|
|align=left|Pyotr Sumin
|align=left|Congress of Russian Communities
|
|37.26%
|-
|style="background-color:"|
|align=left|Vladimir Gorbachyov
|align=left|Communist Party
|
|12.27%
|-
|style="background-color:"|
|align=left|Talgat Khairov
|align=left|Independent
|
|9.54%
|-
|style="background-color:"|
|align=left|Viktor Tsittel
|align=left|Yabloko
|
|7.28%
|-
|style="background-color:"|
|align=left|Sergey Dyachkovsky
|align=left|Independent
|
|5.84%
|-
|style="background-color:"|
|align=left|Aleksandr Altynbayev
|align=left|Independent
|
|5.17%
|-
|style="background-color:"|
|align=left|Sergey Voloshin
|align=left|Independent
|
|4.57%
|-
|style="background-color:#3A46CE"|
|align=left|Lev Borisov
|align=left|Democratic Choice of Russia – United Democrats
|
|4.51%
|-
|style="background-color:#D50000"|
|align=left|Aleksandr Zhivoluk
|align=left|Communists and Working Russia - for the Soviet Union
|
|3.66%
|-
|style="background-color:#000000"|
|colspan=2 |against all
|
|7.83%
|-
| colspan="5" style="background-color:#E9E9E9;"|
|- style="font-weight:bold"
| colspan="3" style="text-align:left;" | Total
| 
| 100%
|-
| colspan="5" style="background-color:#E9E9E9;"|
|- style="font-weight:bold"
| colspan="4" |Source:
|
|}

1997 June
After Pyotr Sumin was elected Governor of Chelyabinsk Oblast in December 1996 he had to give up his seat in the State Duma. A by-election was scheduled for 29 June 1997 with the concurrent by-election in the Sovetsky constituency. The by-election in Kyshtym constituency was won by Vasily Kichedzhi, however, the resultse were annulled due to low turnout (23.99%) and another election was scheduled for 14 December 1997.

1997 December

|-
! colspan=2 style="background-color:#E9E9E9;text-align:left;vertical-align:top;" |Candidate
! style="background-color:#E9E9E9;text-align:left;vertical-align:top;" |Party
! style="background-color:#E9E9E9;text-align:right;" |Votes
! style="background-color:#E9E9E9;text-align:right;" |%
|-
|style="background-color:"|
|align=left|Vladimir Gorbachyov
|align=left|Independent
|-
|38.91%
|-
| colspan="5" style="background-color:#E9E9E9;"|
|- style="font-weight:bold"
| colspan="3" style="text-align:left;" | Total
| -
| 100%
|-
| colspan="5" style="background-color:#E9E9E9;"|
|- style="font-weight:bold"
| colspan="4" |Source:
|
|}

1999

|-
! colspan=2 style="background-color:#E9E9E9;text-align:left;vertical-align:top;" |Candidate
! style="background-color:#E9E9E9;text-align:left;vertical-align:top;" |Party
! style="background-color:#E9E9E9;text-align:right;" |Votes
! style="background-color:#E9E9E9;text-align:right;" |%
|-
|style="background-color:"|
|align=left|Mikhail Grishankov
|align=left|Independent
|
|37.25%
|-
|style="background-color:"|
|align=left|Vladimir Gorbachyov (incumbent)
|align=left|Independent
|
|30.91%
|-
|style="background-color:"|
|align=left|Andrey Drobyshev
|align=left|Independent
|
|7.68%
|-
|style="background-color:#1042A5"|
|align=left|Irina Zubakova
|align=left|Union of Right Forces
|
|4.28%
|-
|style="background-color:"|
|align=left|Aleksandr Chistyakov
|align=left|Independent
|
|3.57%
|-
|style="background-color:#F1043D"|
|align=left|Andrey Belishko
|align=left|Socialist Party
|
|1.84%
|-
|style="background-color:"|
|align=left|Mikhail Voloshin
|align=left|Independent
|
|1.72%
|-
|style="background-color:#FF4400"|
|align=left|Kim Sorokin
|align=left|Andrey Nikolayev and Svyatoslav Fyodorov Bloc
|
|1.36%
|-
|style="background-color:"|
|align=left|Vasily Yeliseyev
|align=left|Independent
|
|1.34%
|-
|style="background-color:"|
|align=left|Yury Safin
|align=left|Independent
|
|0.61%
|-
|style="background-color:#000000"|
|colspan=2 |against all
|
|7.70%
|-
| colspan="5" style="background-color:#E9E9E9;"|
|- style="font-weight:bold"
| colspan="3" style="text-align:left;" | Total
| 
| 100%
|-
| colspan="5" style="background-color:#E9E9E9;"|
|- style="font-weight:bold"
| colspan="4" |Source:
|
|}

2003

|-
! colspan=2 style="background-color:#E9E9E9;text-align:left;vertical-align:top;" |Candidate
! style="background-color:#E9E9E9;text-align:left;vertical-align:top;" |Party
! style="background-color:#E9E9E9;text-align:right;" |Votes
! style="background-color:#E9E9E9;text-align:right;" |%
|-
|style="background-color:"|
|align=left|Mikhail Grishankov (incumbent)
|align=left|United Russia
|
|61.22%
|-
|style="background-color:#C21022"|
|align=left|Aleksandr Mitsukov
|align=left|Russian Pensioners' Party-Party of Social Justice
|
|17.50%
|-
|style="background-color:#D50000"|
|align=left|Aleksandr Zhivoluk
|align=left|Russian Communist Workers Party-Russian Party of Communists
|
|3.11%
|-
|style="background-color:"|
|align=left|Sergey Komkov
|align=left|Agrarian Party
|
|2.44%
|-
|style="background-color:"|
|align=left|Aleksandr Yemelin
|align=left|Liberal Democratic Party
|
|2.23%
|-
|style="background-color: " |
|align=left|Fatima Kobzhasarova
|align=left|Yabloko
|
|1.66%
|-
|style="background-color:"|
|align=left|Vasily Zvyagintsev
|align=left|Independent
|
|0.63%
|-
|style="background-color:#000000"|
|colspan=2 |against all
|
|9.58%
|-
| colspan="5" style="background-color:#E9E9E9;"|
|- style="font-weight:bold"
| colspan="3" style="text-align:left;" | Total
| 
| 100%
|-
| colspan="5" style="background-color:#E9E9E9;"|
|- style="font-weight:bold"
| colspan="4" |Source:
|
|}

2016

|-
! colspan=2 style="background-color:#E9E9E9;text-align:left;vertical-align:top;" |Candidate
! style="background-color:#E9E9E9;text-align:leftt;vertical-align:top;" |Party
! style="background-color:#E9E9E9;text-align:right;" |Votes
! style="background-color:#E9E9E9;text-align:right;" |%
|-
| style="background-color: " |
|align=left|Vladimir Burmatov
|align=left|United Russia
|
|41.68%
|-
| style="background-color: " |
|align=left|Vasily Shvetsov
|align=left|A Just Russia
|
|19.70%
|-
|style="background-color:"|
|align=left|Vitaly Pashin
|align=left|Liberal Democratic Party
|
|10.12%
|-
|style="background-color:"|
|align=left|Konstantin Natsiyevsky
|align=left|Communist Party
|
|7.34%
|-
|style="background-color: " |
|align=left|Aleksey Sevastyanov
|align=left|Yabloko
|
|7.15%
|-
|style="background-color:"|
|align=left|Vladimir Gorbachyov
|align=left|Communists of Russia
|
|4.21%
|-
|style="background-color:"|
|align=left|Yelena Navrotskaya
|align=left|Patriots of Russia
|
|2.09%
|-
|style="background-color:"|
|align=left|Andrey Yatsun
|align=left|Rodina
|
|2.08%
|-
|style="background-color:"|
|align=left|Aleksey Tabalov
|align=left|People's Freedom Party
|
|1.25%
|-
| colspan="5" style="background-color:#E9E9E9;"|
|- style="font-weight:bold"
| colspan="3" style="text-align:left;" | Total
| 
| 100%
|-
| colspan="5" style="background-color:#E9E9E9;"|
|- style="font-weight:bold"
| colspan="4" |Source:
|
|}

2021

|-
! colspan=2 style="background-color:#E9E9E9;text-align:left;vertical-align:top;" |Candidate
! style="background-color:#E9E9E9;text-align:left;vertical-align:top;" |Party
! style="background-color:#E9E9E9;text-align:right;" |Votes
! style="background-color:#E9E9E9;text-align:right;" |%
|-
|style="background-color: " |
|align=left|Vladimir Burmatov (incumbent)
|align=left|United Russia
|
|50.80%
|-
|style="background-color:"|
|align=left|Igor Yegorov
|align=left|Communist Party
|
|13.25%
|-
|style="background-color:"|
|align=left|Dmitry Larin
|align=left|A Just Russia — For Truth
|
|12.78%
|-
|style="background-color:"|
|align=left|Anna Skroznikova
|align=left|New People
|
|6.67%
|-
|style="background-color:"|
|align=left|Yevgeny Baskanov
|align=left|Liberal Democratic Party
|
|4.14%
|-
|style="background-color: "|
|align=left|Maksim Smagin
|align=left|Party of Pensioners
|
|3.92%
|-
|style="background-color: "|
|align=left|Andrey Popov
|align=left|Russian Party of Freedom and Justice
|
|2.25%
|-
|style="background-color: " |
|align=left|Andrey Talevlin
|align=left|Yabloko
|
|1.30%
|-
|style="background-color:"|
|align=left|Aleksandr Tatarnikov
|align=left|Rodina
|
|1.12%
|-
| colspan="5" style="background-color:#E9E9E9;"|
|- style="font-weight:bold"
| colspan="3" style="text-align:left;" | Total
| 
| 100%
|-
| colspan="5" style="background-color:#E9E9E9;"|
|- style="font-weight:bold"
| colspan="4" |Source:
|
|}

Notes

References

Russian legislative constituencies
Politics of Chelyabinsk Oblast